Massimo Mannelli (born 9 April 1956) is an Italian professional golfer.

He played regularly on the European Tour from the late 1970s to the early 1990s and finished a career high 40th on the European Tour Order of Merit in 1980, the year in which he won his home national open, the Italian Open. That was to be his only European Tour win. He was the last Italian golfer to win the event until Francesco Molinari did so in 2006.

Amateur wins
1974 Italian Amateur Championship

Professional wins (6)

European Tour wins (1)

Other wins (5)
This list may be incomplete
1981 National Omnium
1986 National Omnium
1986 Italian National Professional Championship
1990 Italian PGA Championship, Italian National Professional Championship

Results in major championships

Note: Mannelli only played in The Open Championship.

CUT = missed the half-way cut (3rd round cut in 1981, 1983 and 1985 Open Championships)

Team appearances
Amateur
Eisenhower Trophy (representing Italy): 1974, 1976
European Youths' Team Championship (representing Italy): 1975 (winners), 1976, 1977

Professional
World Cup (representing Italy): 1983, 1989
Hennessy Cognac Cup (representing the Continent of Europe): 1980, (representing Italy) 1984
Alfred Dunhill Cup (representing Italy): 1989

References

External links

Italian male golfers
European Tour golfers
1956 births
Living people